"The Last Time" is a song by Irish rock band The Script, released through Sony Music UK as the lead single from their sixth studio album, Sunsets & Full Moons, on 20 September 2019.

Background
Frontman Danny O'Donoghue said the song was written "about the intense feelings you experience when you realise you may be seeing the one you love [...] for the last time".

Critical reception
Mike Wass of Idolator wrote that the track is a "throwback to the anthemic stadium-rock of Science & Faith and No Sound Without Silence" as well as a "bruised and battered breakup song" and "relatable and instantly catchy". Beth Casteel of Substream Magazine described it as a "poignant little number".

Music video
The music video was released the same day as the song and directed by Charles Mehling. It was filmed in London and stars Polish model Anna Jagodzińska.

Charts

Weekly charts

Year-end charts

Certifications

References

2019 singles
2019 songs
The Script songs
Songs about heartache
Songs written by James Abrahart
Songs written by Danny O'Donoghue
Songs written by Mark Sheehan
Torch songs